Foxy Lady is the second studio album by American singer and drag queen RuPaul. It was released on October 29, 1996, by Rhino Records. It is the follow-up to RuPaul's critically and commercially successful 1993 album Supermodel of the World. Foxy Lady explores similar genres to those of his first album, including dance and house.

Album information
Despite the huge success of Supermodel of the World, Foxy Lady failed to chart on the Billboard 200 despite reaching #15 on the Billboard Heatseakers chart and producing two mildly successful singles. Its first single "Snapshot" reached #95 on the Billboard Hot 100, #4 on the Billboard Dance Music/Club Play Singles, and #10 on the Billboard Hot Dance Music. The next single "A Little Bit of Love" reached #28 on the Billboard Dance Music/Club Play Singles. The single's music video depicted RuPaul along with female impersonator Jazzmun and transgender cabaret performer Candis Cayne as aliens out to conquer the world. The video received a GLAAD Media Award nomination for Best Video of 1998. The clip, directed by Randy Barbato and Fenton Bailey, was in included on RuPaul's Work It Girl compilation DVD.

Reception
Foxy Lady received generally positive reviews upon release in November 1996. Billboard said it "offers a glimpse into a soulful stylist who needs to be heard far more frequently in the future". Stephen Thomas Erlewine from AllMusic said "Foxy Lady was an attempt to expand RuPaul's pop culture phenomenon status into a genuine career, and it didn't quite succeed. Although RuPaul is supported by a number of fine producers who help give the album a sleek, attractive sound, the record lacks a song as catchy or kitschy as 'Supermodel,' which ironically makes it a bit of a faceless album." Alanna Nash critiqued the album for Stereo Review and faulted a disco-beat-heavy production, which she theorized was perhaps the result of its several producers. "Foxy Lady often sounds like the rumblings of a bank of overheated computers," Nash opined.

Track listing

Chart positions

Credits

RuPaul — vocals
Pete Lorimer Arranger — producer
Richard "Humpty" Vission — arranger, producer
Rachel Gutek Art Direction — design
Diana Germano — assistant engineer
Jason Perez — assistant engineer
Charles Barwick — engineer
Fenton Bailey — executive producer
Randy Barbato — executive producer
Jay Mitchell — guitar
Mathu Anderson — hair stylist
Geoff Sykes — mastering
Albert Sanchez — photography
Eric Kupper — producer, engineer
Jimmy Harry — producer, mixing
Joe Wolfe — programming, engineer, mixing
Bruce Weeden — programming, producer, engineer, mixing
Scott Alspach — programming, producer
Eddie Montilla — programming, producer

Joe Carrano — background vocals, programming, producer, engineer, mixing
L'Wren Scott — stylist
Nick Martinelli — background vocals, producer
Kelly Bienvenue — background vocals
Alex Brown — background vocals
Jackie Gouchee Farris — background vocals
Guy A. Fortt — background vocals
Lee Genesis — background vocals
Connie Harvey — background vocals
Fabio Hoyos — background vocals
Robbie Jenkins — background vocals
Mariachi Aguila Real — background vocals
Phyllis Miller — background vocals
Britt Savage — background vocals
Latasha Spencer — background vocals
Tony Warren — background vocals
Therese Willis — background vocals
Yolanda Wyns — background vocals

References

1996 albums
RuPaul albums
Rhino Records albums